Golice may refer to a number of settlements:

Golice, Łódź Voivodeship (central Poland)
Golice, Masovian Voivodeship (east-central Poland)
Golice, Lubusz Voivodeship (west Poland)
Golice, West Pomeranian Voivodeship (north-west Poland)
Golice, Kamnik, a settlement in the Municipality of Kamnik, Slovenia